Dimeresia is a monotypic genus in the sunflower family containing the single species Dimeresia howellii, known by the common name doublet.

Distribution
This uncommon plant is endemic to an area of the Great Basin region in the western United States, in northeastern California, southeastern Oregon, southwestern Idaho, and northwestern Nevada.

Description
Dimeresia howellii is a very tiny annual flowering plant rarely exceeding 4 centimeters in height or width. It forms a small tuft on the ground with several oval-shaped leaves, and is cobwebby at base and glandular above.

The inflorescence has tiny white to purple bell-shaped flowers each a few millimeters long. The flowering period is May to August.

References

External links
 Calflora Database: Dimeresia howellii (Doublet)
 USDA Plants Profile for Dimeresia howellii (doublet)
 Jepson Manual eFlora (TJM2) treatment of Dimeresia howellii
 UC CalPhotos gallery of Dimeresia howellii (doublet)
 

Chaenactideae
Flora of California
Flora of Nevada
Flora of Oregon
Flora of the Great Basin
Endemic flora of the United States
~
Monotypic Asteraceae genera
Flora without expected TNC conservation status